Harold J. Curry (June 7, 1932 – March 21, 2022) was an American lawyer and politician.

Curry was born in Phillipsburg, and graduated from Phillipsburg High School in 1949. Curry served in the United States Army from 1953 to 1955 and was commissioned a first lieutenant. He graduated from Lafayette College in 1953 and received his law degree from Rutgers Law School in 1958. He was admitted to the New Jersey bar and practiced law in Phillipsburg. Curry served in the New Jersey General Assembly from 1964 to 1968.

References

1932 births
2022 deaths
People from Phillipsburg, New Jersey
Military personnel from New Jersey
New Jersey lawyers
Lafayette College alumni
Phillipsburg High School (New Jersey) alumni
Politicians from Warren County, New Jersey
Rutgers Law School alumni
Members of the New Jersey General Assembly